Abraham Kiptum (born 5 September 1989) is a Kenyan long-distance runner and former half marathon world record holder. On 28 October 2018 Kiptum ran the Valencia Half Marathon in Valencia, Spain in a time of 58:18, which would have been a world record (world record 58:23), but in 2019 this world record was nullified, because of a doping violation verdict in 2019. The half marathon world record was then improved by Geoffrey Kipsang Kamworor on 15 September 2019, to a time of 58:01.

Kiptum's debut in the marathon was the Rabat Marathon in 2015, where he placed third with a time of 2:11:36. In the inaugural Abu Dhabi Marathon on 7 December 2018, he finished as the runner-up with 2:04:16, 12 seconds behind the winner Marius Kipserem. He improved his PB from the 2017 Amsterdam Marathon by 70 seconds.

On 26 April 2019 The Athletics Integrity Unit confirmed a Provisional Suspension against Kiptum for an Athlete Biological Passport (ABP) violation under the IAAF Anti-Doping Rules. Kiptum was withdrawn from the 2019 London Marathon in consequence of the suspension. On 11 November that year, a four-year suspension, and expunging of results, was confirmed. Kiptums race time's going back to 13 October 2018 were nullified.

Personal life 
Abraham Kiptum was born in Chepketei Kosirai Village, Kenya as the third of four children. Kiptum went to Kosirai Primary School and Kipmokoch Secondary School. He is coached by Joshua Kiprugut Kemei.

Competition record

Road running

References

Living people
1989 births
Kenyan male long-distance runners
Kenyan male marathon runners
World record setters in athletics (track and field)
Doping cases in athletics
Kenyan sportspeople in doping cases
People from Nandi County